At the Half Note Cafe is a live album by American trumpeter Donald Byrd recorded in 1960 at the Half Note in Manhattan and released on the Blue Note label originally as two single LP issues (BLP 4060 and BLP 4061) and reissued as a double CD set.

Reception
The Allmusic review by Thom Jurek awarded the album 4½ stars and stated "This was a hot quintet, one that not only swung hard, but possessed a deep lyricism and an astonishing sense of timing, and one need only this set by them to feel the full measure of their worth". The Penguin Guide to Jazz wrote that the sessions were "impeccable played and atmospherically recorded, but they tend to show off the best and worst of Byrd: [...] he peels off chorus after chorus of manicured licks, and the process gets repeated throughout".

Track listing
All compositions by Donald Byrd except as indicated
 Introduction by Ruth Mason - 1:20  
 "My Girl Shirl" (Duke Pearson) - 10:32  
 "Soulful Kiddy" - 9:55  
 "Child's Play" (Byrd, Pearson) - 8:45  
 "Chant" (Pearson) - 11:03  
 "A Portrait of Jennie" (Gordon Burdge, J. Russel Robinson) 6:48  
 "Cecile" - 14:46  
 "Jeannine" (Oscar Brown, Jr., Pearson) - 13:08  
 "Pure D. Funk" - 6:09  
 "Between the Devil and the Deep Blue Sea" (Harold Arlen, Ted Koehler) - 9:54  
 "Theme from Mr. Lucky" (Henry Mancini) - 10:51  
 "Kimyas" - 11:58  
 "When Sunny Gets Blue" (Marvin Fisher, Jack Segal) - 6:17  
Recorded at the Half Note Cafe, NY on November 11, 1960.

Personnel
Donald Byrd - trumpet
Pepper Adams - baritone saxophone except track 6
Duke Pearson - piano
Laymon Jackson - bass
Lex Humphries - drums

References

1960 live albums
Blue Note Records live albums
Donald Byrd albums